The Karnei Shomron Mall suicide bombing was a suicide bombing which occurred on February 16, 2002 in the Israeli settlement of Karnei Shomron. Three teenagers were killed in the attack.

The Palestinian militant organization Popular Front for the Liberation of Palestine claimed responsibility for the attack.

The attack
On Saturday night, 16 February 2002, a Palestinian suicide bomber, who was wearing a 25-pound nail-studded explosive device strapped to his body, approached the popular crowded open mall in the Karnei Shomron settlement located in the West Bank.

The militant detonated the bomb at the entrance to a pizza parlor at about 7:45 p.m. The blast killed three teenagers (a 15-year-old girl, a 16-year-old girl, and a 15-year-old boy) and injured 27 people, six of them seriously. Two of the teenagers were killed instantly, while a third died of her wounds on February 27.

The perpetrators 
Officials from the Palestinian militant organization Popular Front for the Liberation of Palestine claimed responsibility for the attack and stated that the bomber was Sadek Abdel Hafeth, an 18-year-old Palestinian from the nearby town of Qalqilya.

See also
 List of terrorist incidents, 2002

References

External links 
 West Bank Suicide Bombing Kills 2 Israelis and Hurts 30 - published in the New York Times on February 17, 2002
 Israel hits back in West Bank - published in the BBC News on February 17, 2002

Suicide bombings in 2002
Terrorist incidents in the West Bank in 2002
Terrorist attacks attributed to Palestinian militant groups
Murdered Israeli children
Suicide bombing in the Israeli–Palestinian conflict
Terrorist incidents in the Palestinian territories
Shopping mall bombings
Building bombings in Israel